Frank Farkas is a former member of the Florida House of Representatives.

Biography
Farkas was born on May 17, 1956 in Milwaukee, Wisconsin. He is a graduate of St. Petersburg Junior College, Palmer College of Chiropractic and Eckerd College. Farkas is married to Toni Lee Witkowski and has two children. He is Roman Catholic.

Political career
Farkas was a member of the House of Representatives from 1999 to 2006. He is a Republican.

References

External links
Florida House of Representatives Profile
The Political Graveyard

Politicians from Milwaukee
Catholics from Wisconsin
Catholics from Florida
Republican Party members of the Florida House of Representatives
American chiropractors
St. Petersburg College alumni
Palmer College of Chiropractic alumni
Eckerd College alumni
1956 births
Living people